Otto Kaiser (8 May 1901 – 7 June 1977) was an Austrian pair skater.  Competing in partnership with Lilly Scholz, he became the 1928 Olympic silver medalist and 1929 World champion. The pair won the bronze medal at Worlds in 1925 and silver from 1926 through 1928.

Results
with Lilly Scholz

References
 Skatabase: 1920s Worlds results
 Skatabase: 1920s Olympics results

External links

 Database Olympics profile

Navigation

1901 births
1977 deaths
Austrian male pair skaters
Figure skaters at the 1928 Winter Olympics
Olympic silver medalists for Austria
Olympic figure skaters of Austria
Olympic medalists in figure skating
World Figure Skating Championships medalists
Medalists at the 1928 Winter Olympics